Slavenko Kuzeljević (born 20 April 1958) is a Serbian football manager and former player.

Playing career
Born in Priboj, Kuzeljević started out at his hometown club FAP, making his senior debut in 1977. He was transferred to Budućnost Titograd in 1980. Later on, Kuzeljević would go on to spend the majority of his career with Sutjeska Nikšić in two spells, making over 250 appearances for the club in the Yugoslav First League and Second League combined.

Managerial career
During his managerial career, Kuzeljević worked at numerous clubs in Serbia and Montenegro, most notably with Metalac Gornji Milanovac (2005–2009) and Radnički Kragujevac (July 2011–October 2012). He subsequently took charge of Serbian SuperLiga club Novi Pazar in December 2012.

Honours
Metalac Gornji Milanovac
 Serbian League West: 2006–07

References

External links

 
 
 

1958 births
Living people
People from Priboj
Yugoslav footballers
Serbian footballers
Association football defenders
FK FAP players
FK Budućnost Podgorica players
FK Sutjeska Nikšić players
Yugoslav Second League players
Yugoslav First League players
Serbia and Montenegro football managers
Serbian football managers
FK Javor Ivanjica managers
FK Borac Čačak managers
FK Hajduk Kula managers
FK Sutjeska Nikšić managers
FK Metalac Gornji Milanovac managers
FK Banat Zrenjanin managers
FK Radnički 1923 managers
FK Novi Pazar managers
FK Jagodina managers
Serbian SuperLiga managers